All Bar One is a pub chain consisting of 56 bars in the United Kingdom, owned and operated by Mitchells and Butlers plc which was part of the Six Continents group (previously Bass) until 2003.

Décor
The concept was designed by Bass as a 'female friendly' bar at a time when many pubs and bars were considered intimidating places for single women to go and drink or eat, hence the huge glass frontage, the open plan space and the bright airy interiors. There were huge wooden tables. The design was formulated by Amanda Wilmott in February 1994. This followed the lead of existing female-friendly bar chains such as Pitcher & Piano and Slug and Lettuce. Wilmott, a former director of Slug & Lettuce, designed a similar chain for Yates Brothers Wine Lodges called Ha! Ha! Bar & Canteen, which first opened in February 1998 in Bristol; Mitchells & Butlers bought the brand's 22 pubs for £19m from Bay Restaurant Group in September 2010, converting some of them to All Bar One pubs. Bass Leisure Retail opened another chain, Edward's, in the late 1990s that was similar.

History
In October 1994, Wilmott found Mary-Jane Brook and Nelly Benstead to run the first outlet. The first bar was opened in December 1994 in Sutton, London, town centre by Bass Taverns, run by Sir Ian Prosser, who also owned Fork and Pitcher and Harvester. Bass bought Harvester in 1994. In its style, many pub chains have followed where All Bar One led.

Five outlets opened in 1995 (including Islington, Wimbledon and Richmond in London). By 1996, Bass had 15 All Bar One pubs, 69 O'Neill's pubs and 102 Harvesters. By 1999 there were 46 in the chain. Jeremy Spencer, a friend of gastropub-inventor Mike Belben, was responsible for creating the brand of pub. In 1999, Jeremy Spencer was replaced by Karen Forrester (who previously ran O'Neills, and who now runs T.G.I. Fridays UK) who stayed until May 2001.

In August 2001 it opened its first overseas establishment in Cologne. Bass Leisure Retail (BLR) became Six Continents in June 2002.

As of 2016, there were "close to 50" outlets in the UK, mostly based in Central London however they have expanded throughout the UK as far as Aberdeen, where they opened a bar in the new Marischal Square development in March 2018.

Estate

Scotland

 Marischal Square, Aberdeen
 George Street, Edinburgh
 Exchange Plaza, Edinburgh
 Edinburgh Airport (Gate 5 and Gate 16)
 St. Vincent Street, Glasgow

East of England

 St Andrew's Street, Cambridge
 Norwich (Tombland)

Midlands
 Birmingham Airport (airside and landside)
 Birmingham New Street station
 Birmingham (Brindleyplace and Newhall Street)
 Montpellier, Cheltenham
 Nottingham (Lace Market tram stop)

North West England
 Liverpool (Derby Square)
 King Street, Manchester
 Trafford Centre
 Chester (Pepper Street)

Yorkshire and the Humber

 Harrogate (Parliament Street, A61)
 Leeds (Millennium Square and Greek Street)
 Sheffield (Leopold Square)
 York (New Street)

South East England

 2–3 Pavilion Buildings, Brighton 
 Guildford (North Street)
 Milton Keynes (Midsummer Boulevard)
 High Street, Oxford
 Gunwharf Quays, Portsmouth
 The Oracle, Reading
 Westquay, Southampton
 Windsor Royal railway station

London

 Appold Street (Broadgate)
 Northcote Road, Battersea
 Bishopsgate
 Shad Thames, Butler's Wharf
 Byward Street
 Mackenzie Walk, Canary Wharf
 Cannon Street
 Chiswell Street
 Clapham Junction 
 Euston Square
 Henrietta Street, Covent Garden
 Houndsditch
 Kingsway, London (Holborn)
 Ludgate Hill
 The O2 Arena, Greenwich
 New Oxford Street
 Picton Place
 Regent Street
 Sutton (original in 1994)
 Victoria, London
 Villiers Street
 Waterloo
 Wimbledon (Wimbledon Hill Road)

References

External links
 
 

Mitchells & Butlers
Pub chains
Bars (establishments)